Buz  aka Frank Altimare is a drummer. He was the drummer in '90s band Psychotica. Prior to joining Psychotica, Buz was the drummer for LA Punk band Youth Gone Mad. Buz appeared on the Youth Gone Mad 1994 album Day Job.

In the early 2000s Buz played on material by NY band The Bastard Kings of Rock.

Buz currently lives and works in New York.

References

Year of birth missing (living people)
Living people
American rock drummers